Annie is a Sandbagger sloop located at Mystic Seaport in Mystic, Connecticut, United States. Built in 1880 in Mystic by David O. Richmond, Annie was built for Henry H. Tift and was used for competitive racing. Annie was donated to Mystic Seaport in 1931 and was the first vessel in their collection of watercraft. In 2004 she underwent an extensive restoration to return her to her original configuration.

See also
Annie 30, a sailboat design with the same name

References

Mystic, Connecticut
Museum ships in Mystic, Connecticut
1880 ships
Individual sailing vessels
Ships built in Mystic, Connecticut
Sloops of the United States